Ben Shlomo Lipman-Heilprin (1902 –   26 September 1968) was an Israeli physician and director of the Neurology Department of Hadassah Hospital in Jerusalem.

Biography
Ben Shlomo Lipman-Heilprin was born in Białystok, Poland in 1902. He studied medicine in Germany and  immigrated to  Mandate Palestine in 1934. In 1952, Heilprin composed the Hebrew Hippocratic Oath.

Awards
Heilprin was the first recipient of the Israel Prize for medicine, which was awarded to him in 1953, the inaugural year of the prize.

See also
 List of Israel Prize recipients
 List of German Jews
 Heilprin

References

20th-century Israeli Jews
Israel Prize in medicine recipients
Israeli neurologists
Jews in Mandatory Palestine
People from Białystok
Polish emigrants to Mandatory Palestine
1902 births
1968 deaths